Julius G. Ingram (May 31, 1832 – May 13, 1917) was a member of the Wisconsin State Assembly.

Early life
Julius Ingram was born on May 31, 1832 in Saratoga County, New York. His brother, Orrin Henry Ingram, was a lumber baron.

Career
Ingram was a member of the Assembly in 1878 and 1879. He was a Republican.

Ingram served on the board of trustees of the Eau Claire asylum.

Personal life
He first married Mary Linda Van Wagenen. They had three children before her death on September 13, 1879. Ingram later married Ella Moffat on June 24, 1886. They had one child. Ingram was a Congregationalist.

Death and legacy
Ingram died at his home on May 13, 1917. He was buried at the Lake View Cemetery, Eau Claire, Wisconsin, U.S.

His nephew, Erskine B. Ingram, became a high-profile businessman. His descendants are the owners of Ingram Industries and its subsidiaries, which include Ingram Barge Company, Ingram Content Group, Ingram Entertainment Holdings Inc., Ingram Micro and Lightning Source.

References

External links

1832 births
1917 deaths
People from Saratoga County, New York
Politicians from Eau Claire, Wisconsin
American Congregationalists
19th-century Congregationalists
Republican Party members of the Wisconsin State Assembly
Ingram family
Burials in Wisconsin
19th-century American politicians